Mark Allen Farris (born February 9, 1975) is a former quarterback for Texas A&M University and a former shortstop in the Pittsburgh Pirates minor league system. He is the son of Nancy and Phil Farris of Angleton, Texas. He has two daughters, Kameryn and Kendyll. He is married to Amanda Payan Farris and they have a son, Deacon.

High school career

Farris was an all-district QB for Angleton High School in 1992 and 1993, and was the district MVP in 1993. He passed for 1,831 yards and 21 TDs as a senior and 1,784 and 14 as a junior. In baseball, he was a three-time all-district selection and made the all-state pick his senior year. Farris also lettered in basketball. He was rated the #3 quarterback in Texas by Dave Campbell's Texas Football magazine in 1993, and was highly recruited in both baseball and football. He signed an NCAA letter of intent with Texas A&M in 1994, but chose instead to sign with the Pittsburgh Pirates after being drafted in the first round the Major League Baseball Draft.

Baseball career
Made it as high as AA in the Pirates minor league system, finishing in 1998 with the Carolina Mudcats of the Southern League where he hit .273 with 6 home runs.

College career

1999 season
Played in five games as a reserve and completed 6-of-16 passes for 53 yards. Played late in the Aggies' Alamo Bowl appearance against Penn State.

2000 season
Started every game at QB and had what was, at the time, the most prolific season in school history. Completed 208-of-347 passes (.599) for 2,551 yards with 10 touchdowns and 9 interceptions. Rushed for 116 yards and 2 touchdowns, and even grabbed a 10-yard reception. Threw for over 200 yards seven times and over 300 once. Completed a 93-yard pass to Robert Ferguson against Wyoming, the second-longest pass in school history. Tied an A&M bowl record by connecting on 81.8 percent of his passes (9-of-11) in the Independence Bowl. Was voted team captain by his teammates at the end of the season.

2001 season
Completed 203-of-347 pass attempts (.585 percentage) for 2,094 yards and 8 touchdowns while starting all 11 games for the Aggies. Had a two 300-yard plus passing games, including a career-high 341 yards against Wyoming. Had a career-high 3 passing touchdowns against Big 12 North Champion Colorado in Boulder. Completed 9-of-19 passes for 191 yards and a touchdown with no interceptions in the Aggies' 28-9 Galleryfurniture.com Bowl victory over TCU.

2002 season
Was inconsistent in the Aggies' opening game against University of Louisiana-Lafayette and shaky in the next game against the Pitt Panthers, being pulled in favor of Dustin Long. With a young, struggling team and two talented underclassman quarterbacks, coach R. C. Slocum chose to go with Long and Reggie McNeal for the remainder of the season. Farris would not see the field again in 2002 and finished the year with 251 yards passing, no touchdowns, and no interceptions.

Although Farris' career ended in a disappointing manner, he did become only the second Aggie quarterback to post consecutive 2,000-yard passing seasons. In the A&M career record book, Farris stands No. 4 in passing yards, No. 3 in completions, No. 4 in attempts, No. 1 in completion percentage and No. 8 in passing touchdowns. His W-L record as a starter was 17–9.

External links
Minor League statistics at The Baseball Cube
Aggie QB records

1975 births
Living people
People from Harlingen, Texas
Players of American football from Texas
American football quarterbacks
Texas A&M Aggies football players
Angleton High School alumni
Augusta GreenJackets players
Carolina Mudcats players
Lynchburg Hillcats players
Welland Pirates players